Harald Johannes Økern (19 January 1898 – 17 August 1977) was a Norwegian Nordic combined skier who won the event at the Holmenkollen ski festival in 1922 and 1924. For his Nordic combined victories, Økern shared the Holmenkollen medal in 1924 with Johan Grøttumsbråten.

He was born and died in Bærum.

At the 1924 Winter Olympics he finished fourth in the Nordic combined event.

Harald Økern was the uncle of Olav Økern, who later earned the Holmenkollen medal in 1950.

He was the father of Marit Økern Jensen.

References

 
 Holmenkollen medalists - click Holmenkollmedaljen for downloadable pdf file 
 Holmenkollen winners since 1892 - click Vinnere for downloadable pdf file 

  

1898 births
1977 deaths
Norwegian male Nordic combined skiers
Olympic Nordic combined skiers of Norway
Nordic combined skiers at the 1924 Winter Olympics
Holmenkollen medalists
Holmenkollen Ski Festival winners
Sportspeople from Bærum